Magnus Barefoot Cinema Centre (Norwegian: Magnus Barfot Kino) is a cinema multiplex in Bergen, Norway. It is the main venue of Bergen International Film Festival. 

The cinema is owned by Bergen Kino AS. It was named after the street that runs along the building (however, it is not the address of the complex), which in turned was named after 11th-century Norwegian monarch Magnus Barefoot (1073–1103). 
The cinema complex, which opened to the public on October 1, 2004, has five cinemas over five floors with a total of 1,060 seats.   The building was designed by  the architectural firm  Grieg Arkitekter.

References

External links
Bergen Kino website

Buildings and structures in Bergen
Tourist attractions in Bergen
Buildings and structures completed in 2004
Cinemas in Norway